Cucullia charon is a species of moth in the family Noctuidae (the owlet moths). It is found in North America.

The MONA or Hodges number for Cucullia charon is 10191.2.

References

Further reading

 
 
 

Cucullia
Articles created by Qbugbot
Moths described in 1995